Macrophage scavenger receptor 1, also known as MSR1, is a protein which in humans is encoded by the MSR1 gene. MSR1 has also been designated CD204 (cluster of differentiation 204).

Function 

This gene encodes the class A macrophage scavenger receptors, which include three different types (1, 2, 3) generated by alternative splicing of this gene. These receptors or isoforms are trimeric integral membrane glycoproteins and have been implicated in many macrophage-associated physiological and pathological processes including atherosclerosis, Alzheimer's disease, and host defense. They were thought to be expressed macrophage-specific, but recently shown to be present on different dendritic cells classes, too.

The isoforms type 1 and type 2 are functional receptors and are able to mediate the endocytosis of modified low density lipoproteins (LDLs). The isoform type 3 does not internalize modified LDL (acetyl-LDL) despite having the domain shown to mediate this function in the types 1 and 2 isoforms. It has an altered intracellular processing and is trapped within the endoplasmic reticulum, making it unable to perform endocytosis. The isoform type 3 can inhibit the function of isoforms type 1 and type 2 when co-expressed, indicating a dominant negative effect and suggesting a mechanism for regulation of scavenger receptor activity in macrophages.

Biotechnology application 

Macrophage scavenger receptor has been shown to mediate adhesion of macrophages and other cell lines to tissue culture plastic.

Interactions
MSR1 has been shown to interact with HSPA1A.

References

Further reading 

Clusters of differentiation
Scavenger receptors